Alexander James Whiteford McNeilly (August 7, 1845 – October 9, 1911) was an Irish-born lawyer and political figure in Newfoundland. He represented Bonavista from 1873 to 1878, Twillingate and Fogo from 1878 to 1882 and Bay de Verde from 1885 to 1889 in the Newfoundland and Labrador House of Assembly.

He was born in Armagh, the son of Isaac McNeily and Olivia Whiteford, and came to Newfoundland with his brother and widowed mother in 1849. McNeilly studied at Queen's University in Ireland, articled in law with Hugh William Hoyles and was called to the bar in 1870. In 1878, he married Jessie Emma Sutcliff, the daughter of James Johnstone Rogerson. McNeilly was named Queen's Counsel in 1880. He was speaker for the Newfoundland assembly from 1879 to 1882 and from 1886 to 1889. He served as registrar for the Supreme Court of Newfoundland and Labrador from 1889 to 1900. He died in St. John's at the age of 66.

References 

Speakers of the Newfoundland and Labrador House of Assembly
1845 births
1911 deaths
Canadian King's Counsel
19th-century King's Counsel
Newfoundland Colony people